Michael A. Carter (died 21 September 2004) was a British sound engineer. He was nominated for two Oscars in the Best Sound category for A Passage to India in 1985 and for Aliens in 1987 and was also nominated for a BAFTA in the Best Sound category in 1996 for GoldenEye. He worked on over 60 films between 1984 and 2004.

Selected filmography
 A Passage to India (1984)
 Aliens (1986)
 GoldenEye (1995)

References

External links

Year of birth missing
2004 deaths
British audio engineers